Sergey Mikhaylovich Mikhalyov (5 October 1947 – 21 April 2015) was a Russian ice hockey coach. He coached Salavat Yulaev Ufa in the 2008–09 and 2011–12 seasons, and was the general manager of Lada Togliatti in the VHL. In 2006, he coached Russia men's national junior ice hockey team to a silver medal. Mikhalyov was born in Chelyabinsk, Russia. On 21 April 2015, he was killed in a head-on collision with a truck on a highway in Chelyabinsk region while returning home from the funeral of Traktor Chelyabinsk coach Valery Belousov.

References

External links
 Хоккеист и тренер Сергей Михалёв: биография, достижения, личная жизнь(Hockey player and coach Sergei Mikhalev: biography, achievements, personal life) 

1947 births
2015 deaths
Sportspeople from Chelyabinsk
Soviet ice hockey players
Salavat Yulaev Ufa players
Soviet ice hockey coaches
Russian ice hockey coaches
Road incident deaths in Russia
HC Lada Togliatti
Recipients of the Medal of the Order "For Merit to the Fatherland" II class